Randy Rides Alone is a 1934 American Pre-Code Western film starring John Wayne, Yakima Canutt, and George Hayes (before Hayes developed his famous "Gabby" persona). The 53-minute black-and-white film was directed by Harry L. Fraser, produced by Paul Malvern for Lone Star Productions, and released by Monogram Pictures.

Plot
Randy Bowers rides into town, and upon hearing a grossly off-key rendition of "Sobre las Olas" coming from a saloon, enters to investigate. He walks in to find the patrons and bartender all shot dead, with the song coming from a player piano, along with a note advising the local sheriffs not to investigate. The sheriffs arrive and immediately blame Randy for the massacre. Within the sheriff's posse is Matt the Mute, who cannot speak and writes to communicate—using the same handwriting as was found in the note.

Randy escapes with the help of Sally Rogers, the niece of the dead owner of the bar, who survived the massacre by hiding in a crawlspace. Randy runs from the sheriff and ends up in a cave in which the bandits have their hideout. They kidnap Sally, who escapes with Randy's help. Matt the Mute is eventually exposed as the real killer and is himself killed when he enters the bar, which is filled with explosives.

In the end, Randy and Sally are married, and they live happily ever after.

Cast
 John Wayne as Randy Bowers
 Alberta Vaughn as Sally Rogers
 George Hayes as Marvin Black, or Matt Mathews or Matt the Mute
 Yakima Canutt as henchman Spike
 Earl Dwire as Sheriff
 Artie Ortego as Deputy Al

See also
 John Wayne filmography

References

External links 

 
 
 
 
 
 

1934 films
American black-and-white films
1930s English-language films
Films directed by Harry L. Fraser
1934 Western (genre) films
Monogram Pictures films
American Western (genre) films
1930s American films